Douglas Daniel Braga (born July 6, 1985) is a Brazilian footballer.

Career
Daniel Braga played for Süper Lig side Denizlispor.

References

1985 births
Living people
Brazilian footballers
Rio Claro Futebol Clube players
Denizlispor footballers
Süper Lig players
Brazilian expatriate footballers
Expatriate footballers in Turkey
Brazilian expatriate sportspeople in Turkey
Footballers from São Paulo (state)
Association football midfielders